The painted frogfish or spotted frogfish, Antennarius pictus, is a marine fish belonging to the family Antennariidae.

Description
Like other members of its family, it has a globulous, extensible body, with soft skin is covered with small dermal spinules. Its skin is covered partially with few, small, wart-like protuberances, some variably shaped, scab-like blotches and many small eye spots (ocelli) which look like sponges holes. Its large prognathous mouth allows it to consume prey its same size.

The coloring of the body is extremely variable because they always tend to match their living environments. Frogfishes have the capacity to change coloration and pigment pattern in few weeks. However, the dominant coloration goes from white to black, passing through a whole range of related nuances such as cream, pink, yellow, red, and brown, usually with circular eye spots darker than the background color and/or with saddles and blotches. Some specimens can easily be confused with Antennarius maculatus.

These characteristics can help to separate the two close species: usually, A. maculatus has red or orange margins on all fins, and sometimes a spike of the saddle blotch starts posterior to the eye, numerous warts on the skin, and few or no ocellis; A. pictus has also three eye spots on its caudal fin.

Juveniles can have a dark background color with small yellow spots.

The first dorsal spine, the illicium, is modified and is used as a fishing rod. Its extremity is endowed with a characteristic esca (lure), which looks like a small fish with a pinkish to brownish coloration. The illicium is twice the length of the second dorsal spine and its often darkly banded. The second dorsal spine is practically straight and is mobile, and the third one is bent towards the back of the body; both are membranously attached to the head. They are well separated from each other and from the dorsal fin.

The pectoral fins are angled and help, with the pelvic fins, to move the frogfish on the bottom and to keep a stable position for ambush.

Distribution and habitat
Antennarius pictus lives in the tropical and subtropical waters from the Indo-Pacific area, Red Sea included.

Feeding
As all frogfishes, A. pictus is a voracious carnivore which can attack all small animals that pass within its "strike range", mainly fishes, but even sometimes congeners. Its prey can be close to its own size.

Behaviour
Like other members of its family, the painted frogfish has a benthic and solitary lifestyle. They gather during mating period, but do not tolerate each other any more after the act of fertilization. The male can kill or eat the female if she stays too close.

References

External links
Frogfish.ch
Doris.ffessm.fr

Antennariidae
Fish described in 1794